Mohamed Tahir Ayala  (born 1951) is a Sudanese politician who served as Prime Minister of Sudan from February to April 2019. He previously served as the governor of Gezira state beginning in 2015. On 11 April 2019, he was deposed along with the other members of the government in the 2019 Sudanese coup d'état.

Biography
Ayala was born in 1951 in Jubayt, and graduated in economics from the University of Khartoum and Cardiff University, with a Bachelor and master's degree respectively. Soon after the 1989 Sudanese coup d'état he was appointed director of the Sudan Seaports Corporation and later became federal minister for roads and bridges. In 2005 he was appointed governor of Red Sea state. In November 2017, Sudanese President Omar al-Bashir offered Ayala his support for the 2020 presidential election if he were to stand. In response, Ayala said, "The demand of the Gezira people and my demand is for 2020 to be the year where al-Bashir is elected for a third term in office. That’s the demand of all of the Sudanese people."

References

1951 births
Living people
Prime Ministers of Sudan
National Congress Party (Sudan) politicians
University of Khartoum alumni
Alumni of Cardiff University
People of the Sudanese Revolution
Heads of government who were later imprisoned